Hibbertia riparia, commonly known as erect guinea-flower, is a species of flowering plant in the family Dilleniaceae and is endemic to the south-eastern Australia. It is an erect to spreading shrub with hairy foliage, linear leaves and yellow flowers with six to sixteen stamens in a single cluster on one side of two carpels.

Description
Flowering occurs from September to December.

Taxonomy
Erect guinea-flower was first formally described in 1817 by Augustin Pyramus de Candolle in Regni Vegetabilis Systema Naturale and given the name Pleurandra riparia, from an unpublished description by Robert Brown of plant material Brown collected in Tasmania. In 1974, Ruurd Dirk Hoogland changed the name to Hibbertia riparia in the Kew Bulletin. The specific epithet (riparia) means "inhabiting river banks".

In 2010, two new species were segregated from ''Hibbertia riparia: H. devitata and H. setifera.

Distribution and habitat
Erect guinea-flower is found from south-eastern Queensland to Tasmania and westwards to the south-east of South Australia. It grows in a range of habitats from heathland to open forest and is widespread in New South Wales, especially on the coast and tablelands, throughout most of Victoria, the south-east of South Australia and in lowland parts of Tasmania.

References

riparia
Flora of New South Wales
Flora of Queensland
Flora of Tasmania
Flora of Victoria (Australia)
Plants described in 1817
Taxa named by Augustin Pyramus de Candolle